Sandracottus is a genus of beetles in the family Dytiscidae. These aquatic beetles are found in ponds and slow streams from South Asia east to southern Japan, and south to Australia.

Species

The genus contains the following 16 accepted species:

 Sandracottus angulifer Heller, 1934
 Sandracottus bakewellii (Clark, 1864)
 Sandracottus bizonatus Régimbart, 1899
 Sandracottus chevrolati (Aubé, 1838)
 Sandracottus dejeanii (Aubé, 1838)
 Sandracottus femoralis Heller, 1934
 Sandracottus festivus (Illiger, 1802)
 Sandracottus guerini J.Balfour-Browne, 1939
 Sandracottus insignis (Wehncke, 1876)
 Sandracottus jaechi Wewalka & Vazirani, 1985
 Sandracottus maculatus (Wehncke, 1876)
 Sandracottus manipurensis Vazirani, 1969
 Sandracottus mixtus (Blanchard, 1843)
 Sandracottus nauticus Sharp, 1882
 Sandracottus palawanensis Satô, 1979
 Sandracottus rotundus Sharp, 1882

This species was recently described, but its status is uncertain:
 Sandracottus vijayakumari Anand et al., 2021

References

Dytiscidae genera